Anna Elisabeth of Anhalt-Bernburg (19 March 1647 in Bernburg – 3 September 1680 in Bernstadt, now Bierutów), was a princess of Anhalt-Bernburg by birth and by marriage Duchess of Württemberg-Bernstadt.

Life 
Anna Elizabeth was a daughter of Prince Christian II of Anhalt-Bernburg (1599–1656) and his wife Eleonore Sophie of Schleswig-Holstein-Sonderburg (1603–1675), the daughter of the Duke John II of Schleswig-Holstein-Sonderburg. She married on 13 March 1672 in Bernstadt to Duke Christian Ulrich I, Duke of Württemberg-Oels. They had seven children.

The Duchess was well educated and musically gifted, was a talented singer.  She spoke several languages fluently and played numerous musical instruments. She had considerable influence on her husband and advised him in matters of state.

Anna Elizabeth died after complications in her last childbirth on 3 September 1680.

Issue
Louise Elisabeth (born: 22 February 1673 in Bernstadt; died: 28 April 1736 in Forst), Princess of Württemberg-Oels, married Duke Philip of Saxe-Merseburg-Lauchstädt.
Christian Ulrich (born: 21 February 1674 in Bernstadt; died: 2 July 1674 in Bernstadt), Hereditary Prince of Württemberg-Oels.
Leopold Viktor (born: 22 May 1675 in Bernstadt; died: 30 April 1676 in Bernstadt), Hereditary Prince of Württemberg-Oels.
Fredericka Christine (born: 13 May 1676 in Bernstadt; died: 3 June 1676 in Bernstadt), Princess of Württemberg-Oels.
Sophie Angelika (born: 30 May 1677 in Bernstadt; died: 11 November 1700 in Pegau), Princess of Württemberg-Oels, married Duke Frederick Henry of Saxe-Zeitz-Pegau-Neustadt.
Eleonore Amöena (born: 21 October 1678 in Breslau; died: 2 April 1679 in Bernstadt), Princess of Württemberg-Oels.
Theodosia (born: 20 July 1680 in Bernstadt; died: 21 September 1680 in Bernstadt), Princess of Württemberg-Oels.

References 
 Georg Christian Lehms: Teutschlands galante Poetinnen mit ihren sinnreichen und netten Proben ..., Frankfurt am Main, 1715

Footnotes 

House of Ascania
German duchesses
1647 births
1680 deaths
17th-century German people
Daughters of monarchs